David Carr (born 1940, in Parkersburg, West Virginia) is an American phenomenology scholar and a Charles Howard Candler Professor Emeritus of Philosophy from Emory University.

Biography
Carr received his B.A., M.A. and Ph.D. degrees at Yale University, completing his doctorate there in 1966. At Yale he studied under the tutelage of Wilfrid Sellars and Richard J. Bernstein. Concomitantly, as a graduate student, he studied at Heidelberg University under Karl Löwith, Dieter Henrich and Hans-Georg Gadamer, and at University of Paris under Paul Ricœur.

Career
Professor Carr's research, publication and teaching have been devoted to various aspects of Edmund Husserl's philosophy and to phenomenology in general. He is particularly attentive to the philosophy of history. The latter inquiry has led him to explore the nature of narrative, and has thus intersected with literary theory, Hegel's phenomenology, and analytic theories of history. Carr's work is explicitly opposed to that of Louis Mink, Hayden White, and Roland Barthes; Carr considered the basis of narrative structure to inhere in the human phenomenology of experience, even if not in what he described as "merely physical" events. Moreover, his research interests fall on the nature of transcendental philosophy, both in Husserl and in Kant. He is a former Executive Secretary and Board Member of the Society for Phenomenology and Existential Philosophy, and serves on the editorial boards of the philosophical series published by Indiana University Press and Northwestern University Press, and by Springer Verlag.
In retirement Carr has lectured on Husserl and Maurice Merleau-Ponty at The New School for Social Research, and on Husserl's notion of “so etwas wie Leiblichkeit”—something like corporality—at Freie Universität Berlin. He was the doctoral advisor of Margret Grebowicz.

Books
Among Professor Carr's publications are six books—Phenomenology and the Problem of History (1974), Interpreting Husserl (1987), Time, Narrative and History (1991), The Paradox of Subjectivity (1999), Experience and History: Phenomenological Perspectives on the Historical World (2014), and Historical Experience: Essays on the Phenomenology of History (2021), a number of edited or co-edited collections, and the English translation of the major work of the late Husserl, The Crisis of European Sciences and Transcendental Phenomenology. He is the author of numerous essays, a collection of which is translated into Japanese, and a longstanding contributor to History and Theory.

Awards
David Carr's research has been supported by the Alexander von Humboldt Foundation and the Social Sciences and Humanities Research Council of Canada.

References

External links

 
 
 
 

20th-century American philosophers
Phenomenologists
Emory University faculty
Yale University alumni
20th-century American male writers
21st-century American non-fiction writers
1940 births
Living people
The New School faculty
Date of birth missing (living people)
American male non-fiction writers
20th-century American non-fiction writers
21st-century American male writers
21st-century American philosophers